The 1963 South American Championships in Athletics  were held in Cali, Colombia, between 29 June and 7 July.

Medal summary

Men's events

Women's events

Medal table

External links
 Men Results – GBR Athletics
 Women Results – GBR Athletics
 Medallists

South American
South American Championships in Athletics
International athletics competitions hosted by Colombia
South American
1963 in South American sport
June 1963 sports events in South America
July 1963 sports events in South America